This is a list of fellows of the Royal Society elected in 1727.

Fellows
 Mohammed Ben Ali Abgali, ambassador from the Emperor of Morocco 
 Edmond Allen (died 1763) 
 Joseph Andrews (c.1691–1753), Paymaster to the Forces.
 William Carr (died 1742), MP and Mayor of Newcastle 
 Walter Cary (1685–1757), MP and public administrator 
Charles Cavendish (c.1693–1783), MP 
 Francis Clifton (died 1736), physician 
 Nicola Cyrillo (1671–1735), physician  
 Henry Colepeper Fairfax (c.1697–1734), mathematician 
 William Folkes (c.1700–1773), Registrar of the Alienation Office 
 John Fuller (1706–1755), MP for Boroughbridge 
 Edward Harley, 2nd Earl of Oxford and Mortimer (1689–1741) 
 John Harper (died 1735), barrister 
 Benjamin Hoadly (1706–1757), physician 
 John Hollings (1683?–1739), physician 
 Edward Hughes, MP for Saltash 
 Theodore Jacobsen (died 1772), architect and merchant 
 Bernard de Jussieu (1699–1777), French naturalist 
 Charles Lamotte (died 1742), clergyman 
 Philemon Lloyd, Secretary to the Province of Maryland 
 Anton Adam Mansberg, German 
 John Martyn (1699–1768), apothecary and botanist 
 Sir Erasmus Philipps, 5th Baronet (1699–1743), MP for Haverfordwest 
 Thomas Pocock (1672–1745), clergyman 
 Sir Robert Pye, 4th Baronet (c.1696–1734), clergyman 
 Benjamin Robins (1707–1751), engineer and mathematician 
 Thomas Trevor, 2nd Baron Trevor of Bromham (1692–1753) 
 James West (1703–1772), barrister and antiquary 
 Philip Henry Zollman, publisher

Royal fellows
 George II of Great Britain (1683–1760)

References

1727
1727 in science
1727 in England